KOWJ-LP (101.1 FM) is a radio station licensed to Lufkin, Texas, United States. The station is currently owned by V. E. Leach Ministries. On December 1, 2020, the then-KEOE-LP went silent.

References

External links
 

OWJ-LP
OWJ-LP
Radio stations established in 2006
2006 establishments in Texas